The Tajikistan national cricket team represents the country of Tajikistan in international cricket. It is administered by the Tajikistan Cricket Federation. Tajikistan has been a member of Asian Cricket Council since 2012. They were granted associate status by the International Cricket Council (ICC) in July 2021.

In April 2018, the ICC decided to grant full Twenty20 International (T20I) status to all its members. Therefore, all Twenty20 matches played between the Tajikistan and other ICC members after 1 January 2019 will be a full T20I.

History
The Tajikistan national team played three One Days and two T20s in Afghanistan in May 2013 and a reciprocal tour by a team from Afghanistan was staged in Tajikistan in June 2013.

Tajikistan's men's national team toured Afghanistan in December 2013, playing two 40 over matches and one T20 over match versus Afghanistan A.

Associate membership (2021-present)
On 16 July 2021, Tajikistan became an Associate member of the ICC along with Switzerland and Mongolia.

Team colours
The team wore yellow coloured kit with a red outline during their tour of Afghanistan in December 2013.

Head coaches
 Naim Ubed (2012-present)

Squad
Ahmad Shah Ahmadi (Captain)
Murad Ali (Wicketkeeper)
Muhammad Nadeem
Mohammad Nawab
Sohbat Khan
Abeshak Sharma
Aref
Zia ul Haq
Mohammad Monawaar
Nafiz Abbasi
Sudir Komar

Records

Limited-overs records
Last updated:  7 March 2014
The result percentage excludes no results and counts ties as half a win

 
Highest team total: 171/7 in 40 overs v  Afghanistan A, December 29, 2013 at Ghazi Amanullah International Cricket Stadium

Highest individual score

T20 records
Last updated:  7 March 2014
The result percentage excludes no results and counts ties as half a win

Highest team total: 137/6 v  Afghanistan A, December 31, 2013 at Ghazi Amanullah International Cricket Stadium

Highest individual score

Best bowling figures in an innings

References

External links
Tajikistan Cricket Federation
Tajikistan on the cusp of ICC Associate Status

Cricket in Tajikistan
National cricket teams
Cricket
Tajikistan in international cricket